Huang Jiewen (9 January 1913 – 31 July 1963) was a Chinese politician. She was among the first group of women elected to the Legislative Yuan in 1948.

Biography
Originally from Harbin, Huang graduated from the National Normal University and subsequently worked as a researcher at Tokyo Imperial University in Japan. She established the Huitong vocational school and became its principal. She also served as president of the China Children's Welfare Society.

A member of the Kuomintang, she was a delegate to the  that drew up the constitution of the Republic of China. She was subsequently a candidate in Nenjiang Province in the 1948 elections to the Legislative Yuan, in which she was elected to parliament. During the Chinese Civil War she relocated to Taiwan. She died in 1963.

References

1913 births
People from Harbin
Academic staff of the University of Tokyo
Chinese educators
Members of the Kuomintang
20th-century Chinese women politicians
Members of the 1st Legislative Yuan
Members of the 1st Legislative Yuan in Taiwan
1963 deaths